XMZ may refer to:

 Mori Bawah language (ISO 639 language code: xmz)
 XMZ, a concept car version of the Daihatsu Copen convertible kei car
 .XMZ, a file extension used by FastTracker 2
 "XMZ" (Xenofobní Misanthropickou Zrůdu), a 2014 song by 'Master's Hammer' off the album Vagus Vetus

See also

 XM2 (disambiguation)